Lagkagehuset (trading as Ole & Steen  in English-speaking countries) is a Danish bakery chain with over 100 branches in Denmark, London, and New York City.

The present-day business was formed in 2008 through a merger of Ole Kristoffersen and Steen Skallebaek's bakeries, both founded in the early 1990s. Originally owned by private equity firm FSN Capital, it was sold in 2017 to Nordic Capital for a reported . Kristoffersen and Skallebaek stepped down from the board at the time of the sale. Later that year, L Catterton acquired a 20% stake. The current CEO is Jason Cotta, former managing director of Costa Coffee in the United Kingdom.

In May 2020, the company has come under social media scrutiny about their ownership structure and allegations this may enable tax avoidance. The controversy emerged in connection with their receipt of funding from the Danish coronavirus relief package. This prompted the company to issue their accounts early, indicating domestic tax payment.

References

External links

 Official website (Denmark)
 Official website (United Kingdom)
 Official website (United States)

Restaurant chains in Denmark
Companies with year of establishment missing
Bakeries of Denmark
Multinational food companies
Multinational companies headquartered in Denmark